Benjamín Félix Hernández Ruiz  is a Mexican politician from the Institutional Revolutionary Party. In 2003 he served as Deputy of the LVIII Legislature of the Mexican Congress representing Oaxaca.

References

Year of birth missing (living people)
Living people
People from Oaxaca
Institutional Revolutionary Party politicians
21st-century Mexican politicians
Deputies of the LVIII Legislature of Mexico
Members of the Chamber of Deputies (Mexico) for Oaxaca